The 1989 San Francisco State Gators football team represented San Francisco State University as a member of the Northern California Athletic Conference (NCAC) during the 1989 NCAA Division II football season. Led by Vic Rowen in his 29th and final season as head coach, San Francisco State compiled an overall record of 3–7 with a mark of 0–5 in conference play, placing last out of six teams in the NCAC. For the season the team was outscored by its opponents 280 to 165. The Gators played home games at Cox Stadium in San Francisco.

Rowen finished his tenure at San Francisco State with a record of 120–163–10, for a  winning percentage. His teams won five conference championships and they in one bowl game, the Camelia Bowl in 1967.

Schedule

References

San Francisco State
San Francisco State Gators football seasons
San Francisco State Gators football